Haidari (Khaidari) is a suburb in the western part of the Athens agglomeration, west of central Athens.

Geography

The municipality has an area of 22.655 km2. The geography of the municipality of Haidari is diverse: the eastern part, where the town Haidari is situated, is densely populated and forms a continuous built up area with the inner suburbs of central Athens. The rocky Aigaleo hills run through the central part of the municipality. The pine forest of Dafni and the Daphni Monastery lie on the eastern slopes of Aigaleo. The westernmost part of Haidari is the small industrial port town Skaramagkas, on the Saronic Gulf near Eleusis. The main roads of Haidari are the Greek National Road 8 (the old road from Athens to Corinth) and the Iera odos.

History
During the Turkish rule Haidari belonged to a certain Haydar Pasha, which may have been a nickname from the Arabic word haydar, meaning 'lion'.

Concentration camp

The Haidari concentration camp (Greek: στρατόπεδο συγκέντρωσης Χαϊδαρίου, stratópedo syngéntrosis Chaidaríou, German: KZ Chaidari) was a concentration camp operated by the German Schutzstaffel in Haidari during the Axis Occupation of Greece from September 1943 to September 1944.

The camp is now a monument to the Greek Resistance.

Sights of Interest
 Daphni Monastery
 Palataki Tower
 Diomideios Botanical Garden

See also
Haidari FC

Historical population

References

External links
Municipal website

Municipalities of Attica
Populated places in West Athens (regional unit)